Adršpach is a municipality in Náchod District in the Hradec Králové Region of the Czech Republic. It has about 500 inhabitants. It is known for the Adršpach-Teplice Rocks.

Administrative parts
The municipality is made up of villages of Dolní Adršpach and Horní Adršpach.

Geography

It borders Poland in the west. It lies in the Broumov Highlands. The river Metuje flows through the municipality. The largest body of water is lake Pískovna, created by flooding of a sandstone quarry.

The whole territory of Adršpach lies in the Broumovsko Protected Landscape Area. Adršpach is known for the Adršpach-Teplice Rocks, a set of sandstone formations protected as a national nature reserve.

History
The first written mention of Vernéřovice is from 1348.

Transport
There are two railway stations, Adršpach and Horní Adršpach. Koleje Dolnośląskie D28 line runs from Wrocław to Adršpach in summer season.

Sights
The main sights are ruins of a Gothic castle, and Adršpach Chateau from the 16th century. The Climbing Museum is located in the chateau.

In popular culture
The nature in the municipality was used as the filming location for several films and TV series, including The Chronicles of Narnia: The Lion, the Witch and the Wardrobe (2005) and The Musketeers (2014).

Twin towns – sister cities

Adršpach is twinned with:
 Lubawka, Poland
 Radków, Poland

References

External links

Official tourist portal
Adršpach Rocks website 

Villages in Náchod District